The Crowne Plaza Christchurch, formerly known as the Forsyth Barr Building, is located on the south-east corner of the Armagh and Colombo Streets intersection in Christchurch, New Zealand. Originally owned by Bob Jones and branded Robert Jones House by him, it was commonly referred to as Bob Jones Tower, but some called it Bob's Folly. In the 2011 Christchurch earthquake, its staircases collapsed, trapping the occupants. The building reopened in July 2017 as the city's Crowne Plaza hotel.

History
The original building on the location was the Golden Fleece Hotel, built in 1851. The 1980s high-rise was a property speculation by Paynter Developments, who engaged Christchurch architecture firm Warren and Mahoney for the architectural design, and Holmes Consulting Group as structural engineers. Fletcher Construction was the contractor for the project. The building was finished in mid-1989 and sold to Robert Jones Investments (Canterbury), a company owned by Bob Jones. Jones, a property developer who had survived the 1987 stock market crash, named the building Robert Jones House and put the initials "RJI" of his investment company on the building. The building was commonly referred to as Bob Jones Tower, but some called it Bob's Folly in relation to his 1984 election interference. The building was later sold and named for New Zealand investment banking firm Forsyth Barr.

It was an unusual design for Warren and Mahoney, who had until then worked with exposed concrete beams that showed the structure of buildings, but chose a glass curtain wall design with aluminium panels that hid the structure. This construction system became the norm for office buildings for the next two decades based on construction techniques pioneered in Christchurch. According to historian Geoffrey Rice, many architects regard this building as Warren and Mahoney's "ugly duckling", and Paul Walker, professor of architecture at the University of Melbourne, asks: "Does anyone love the monolithic Forsyth Barr building on Colombo Street...?"

In 2008, the Forsyth Barr Building was one of three A-grade office buildings in central Christchurch; the others were the PricewaterhouseCoopers Building, and the Clarendon Tower.

2011 Christchurch earthquake

After the September 11 attacks in 2001, emergency supplies for an evacuation of this high-rise were installed, including ropes, sledge hammers, and axes. In the 2011 Christchurch earthquake, the staircases in Forsyth Barr House collapsed, trapping the occupants. One of the trapped occupants, a trained mountain guide with experience in mountain rescue, had windows broken and abseiled people onto an adjacent car parking building. The photo of one of the occupants being abseiled along the glass façade, taken by The Press photographer John Kirk-Anderson, is one of the enduring images of that earthquake. Search of the building was technically difficult for urban search and rescue (USAR) teams, requiring the deconstruction of 4-tonne stair sets, but the building was cleared with no victims discovered.

The Hotel Grand Chancellor and PricewaterhouseCoopers were both demolished subsequent to the earthquake, hence the Forsyth Barr Building is once more Christchurch's second tallest building. Until mid-2013, it was unclear whether the Forsyth Barr Building would also be demolished, or whether it was economic to repair it.

Subsequent to the earthquakes, the Canterbury Earthquake Recovery Authority (CERA) developed a Christchurch Central Recovery Plan. Almost two city blocks were designated for the Performing Arts Precinct, including the land that the Forsyth Barr Building was located on. This meant that The Crown could have compulsorily acquired the land from its owners if it wanted to go ahead with the Performing Arts Precinct. The designation was later lifted and the size of the Performing Arts Precinct designation reduced after Christchurch City Council had decided to restore the existing Christchurch Town Hall instead of building a new one within this precinct.

Conversion to hotel
The earthquake-damaged building was sold in an "as is, where is" state for NZ$8 million. In December 2014, it was revealed that the building will be leased to the Crowne Plaza chain for a hotel, replacing the former Crowne Plaza hotel that stood diagonally opposite across Victoria Square prior to the earthquakes. In late 2015, new staircases were installed. The new hotel opened on 1 July 2017, offering 204 rooms.

See also
 List of tallest buildings in Christchurch

Notes

References

Skyscrapers in Christchurch
Crowne Plaza hotels
Christchurch Central City
1980s architecture in New Zealand
Skyscraper office buildings in New Zealand
Office buildings completed in 1989